Bowning is a small town in the Southern Tablelands,  west of Yass on the Hume Highway in Yass Valley Shire. Bowning is an aboriginal word meaning 'big hill'.

Bowning was one of the earliest settlements in the district.

Historic buildings include the Troopers Cottage on the Binalong Road and the old Cobb and Co Coaching Station in Bogolong Street.  The coaching station was built sometime between 1850 and 1870. The original local school was amongst the earliest established schools in inland New South Wales, founded in 1849, but now replaced.

Railway
Bowning railway station is on the Main South railway line, and opened in 1876 consisting of two island platforms. The station closed in 1992; however, the structure is still largely intact with a double storey station building on the down platform (now a local craft shop).

Heritage listings
Bowning has a number of heritage-listed sites, including:
 Main Southern railway: Bowning railway station

Gallery

References

External links

Towns in New South Wales
Southern Tablelands
Yass Valley Council
Hume Highway